WD repeat domain 57 (U5 snRNP specific), also known as WDR57, is a gene found in many organisms, including, but not limited to Homo sapiens, Gallus gallus, Pan troglodytes, Canus familiaris, Bos taurus, Mus musculus, and Rattus norvegicus.

Function 

This gene encodes a component of the U5 small nuclear ribonucleoprotein (snRNP) particle. The U5 snRNP is part of the spliceosome, a multiprotein complex that catalyzes the removal of introns from pre-messenger RNAs.

Interactions 

WDR57 has been shown to interact with PRPF8 and EFTUD2.

References

Further reading